"Reason to Believe" is a song written, composed, and first recorded by American folk singer Tim Hardin in 1965. It has since been recorded by artists including Bobby Darin in 1966, Karen Dalton also in 1966, The Youngbloods in 1967,  Peter, Paul and Mary in 1968, Glen Campbell in 1968, Peggy Lee (both in studio and live) in 1968, the Nitty Gritty Dirt Band in 1969, the Carpenters in 1970, and Rod Stewart in 1971 and 1993.

Tim Hardin version
After having had his recording contract terminated by Columbia Records, Tim Hardin achieved some success in the 1960s as a songwriter based in Greenwich Village. The original recording of "Reason to Believe" comes from Hardin's debut album, Tim Hardin 1, recorded in 1965 and released on the Verve Records label in 1966 when he was 25.

Tim Hardin's original recording of the song is also on the soundtrack to the 2000 film Wonder Boys.

The Carpenters version
The Carpenters recorded "Reason to Believe" for their second LP, Close to You, in 1970.  On television, the duo performed their version on The 5th Dimension Travelling Sunshine Show on August 18, 1971 and Make Your Own Kind of Music on September 7, 1971.  Richard Carpenter remixed the song for the release of the 1995 compilation, Interpretations: A 25th Anniversary Celebration.

Rod Stewart versions

Background
Rod Stewart's version appeared as the first single from his 1971 album, Every Picture Tells a Story, with "Maggie May" as the B-side.  "Reason to Believe" reached No. 62 on the Hot 100 on its own before the more popular B-side overtook it on its way to No. 1 on the chart.  The Hot 100 listed "Reason To Believe" as the flip side for the remaining 16 weeks of that run.  Stewart's double-sided hit, which topped the Hot 100 during all five chart weeks of October 1971, held The Carpenters' "Superstar" at No. 2 during the third and fourth of those weeks.

Stewart's version is noted for its instrumentation, featuring a piano, which is heard playing the slow Introduction, before Stewart 's voice is heard singing. This is followed by an electric organ, drums, and an acoustic guitar. It also features a solo violin, which is heard during the instrumental break of the bridge. The piano, along with the organ, play the Song's outro. There is a 2 second pause, before Stewart's Vocal is heard singing the bridge in Acapella, ("Someone like you"), before the piano enters, followed by the violin, the drums and the guitar, featuring a rhythm change form 2/4 to 3/4 for a few measures, before reverting back to the 2/4 rhythm, with Stewart repeating the Bridge before he stops singing, with the instruments carrying on the melody to through the song's fade. The organist was not present during the repeated Bridge session.

A live version was released in 1993 on the album Unplugged...and Seated. Released as the second single from the album in August 1993, it reached No. 19 on the Billboard Hot 100 and No. 3 on the Canadian RPM Top Singles chart. The 1993 single includes a live version of "It's All Over Now", which was recorded during the MTV Unplugged performance but does not appear on the album.

Altogether, the two versions of "Reason to Believe" logged a total of 41 weeks on the Hot 100, more than any other Rod Stewart song.

Charts

Weekly charts
Original version

Live version

Year-end charts

Certifications

References

External links

1971 singles
1993 singles
Songs written by Tim Hardin
Tim Hardin songs
Peter, Paul and Mary songs
Rod Stewart songs
Glen Campbell songs
The Carpenters songs
Bobby Darin songs
The Youngbloods songs
Scott McKenzie songs
Song recordings produced by Rod Stewart
Song recordings produced by Patrick Leonard
Billboard Hot 100 number-one singles
UK Singles Chart number-one singles
Mercury Records singles
Warner Records singles
1965 songs